Elvis istuu oikealla is the fifth studio album by the Finnish singer and songwriter Olavi Uusivirta.

Track listing

Charts

Release history

References

2012 albums
Olavi Uusivirta albums
Finnish-language albums